The following is a list of the Greek fraternities and sororities at Texas State University, and their disciplinary status. If no status exists, readers should assume the organization is operating normally. Readers should also be aware that this list is for informational purposes,  as all Greek life activity at the university is currently suspended.

Closed/unrecognized fraternities and sororities 
Similarly to other educational institutions like Miami University, Texas State University publicly maintains a list of fraternities and sororities that are not recognized by the university due to disciplinary procedures. Universities typically discourage students from joining these suspended organizations, as the institution has no oversight of them, and they have demonstrated dissatisfactory or dangerous behavior.
 Alpha Tau Omega, suspended January 2017 to spring 2020 for hazing and non-hazing violations.
 Delta Tau Delta, suspended January 2017 to spring 2022 for hazing and non-hazing violations.
 Kappa Alpha Order, suspended January 2017 to spring 2021 for hazing and non-hazing violations.
 Phi Kappa Tau, suspended September 2016 to fall 2017 for an unspecified reason.
 Phi Beta Sigma, deferred suspension from April 2017 to summer 2018 for an unspecified reason.
 Pi Kappa Alpha, suspended January 2017 to spring 2019 for hazing and non-hazing violations.
 Omega Psi Phi, suspended April 2015 to fall 2020 for an unspecified reason.
 Sigma Delta Lambda, suspended April 2016 to fall 2021 for an unspecified reason.
 Tau Kappa Epsilon, appears on list of closed fraternities, but not hazing memorandum.

References 

Texas State University
Texas State University